Brian Dalton (born 5 July 1935) is an Australian judoka. He competed in the men's lightweight event at the 1964 Summer Olympics.

References

1935 births
Living people
Australian male judoka
Olympic judoka of Australia
Judoka at the 1964 Summer Olympics
Place of birth missing (living people)